Mercedes "Misty" Knight is a fictional character appearing in American comic books published by Marvel Comics. Created by Tony Isabella and Arvell Jones, Knight was first mentioned (by name) in Marvel Premiere #20 (Jan. 1975) and appeared in the next issue.

Within the context of the Marvel Universe, Knight is a former NYPD police officer whose arm was amputated following a bomb attack. After receiving a bionic prosthetic from Tony Stark, she started a private-investigation agency with close friend, Colleen Wing. The two would later form the crime-fighting duo Daughters of the Dragon. As private investigators, Knight and Wing frequently worked with the Heroes for Hire duo Luke Cage and Iron Fist; Knight is often seen in a romantic relationship with the latter. In 2013, Knight became co-leader of the Valkyrior with Valkyrie in The Fearless Defenders #1 by Cullen Bunn and Will Sliney.

Simone Missick portrayed the character in the Netflix television series Luke Cage (2016–2018), The Defenders (2017), and the second season of Iron Fist (2018), set in the Marvel Cinematic Universe (MCU).

Publication history
Misty Knight was first mentioned in Marvel Premiere #20 (Jan. 1975) and was created by writer Tony Isabella with artist Arvell Jones.  A later retcon in Marvel Team-Up #64 by Chris Claremont and John Byrne would reveal she had previously appeared as an unnamed character in Marvel Team-Up #1 (March 1972), written by Roy Thomas and penciled by Ross Andru. Comics in which Knight and Colleen Wing have starred include a storyline first printed in Deadly Hands of Kung-Fu #32–33 (Jan.—Feb. 1977) and Bizarre Adventures #25 (March 1981) by writer Chris Claremont and penciller Marshall Rogers. The original depictions of Knight, a bionically enhanced black female detective with martial arts skills, were strongly influenced by the blaxploitation and Kung Fu crazes of the 1970s. Misty Knight and Iron Fist had the first interracial kiss between super heroes in mainstream comics in 1977.

She was a longtime supporting character in comic books such as X-Men and Power Man and Iron Fist; she also had a major role in the Deathlok story arc 'Souls of Cyber-Folk' that ran from issue 2–5 of the 1991 Deathlok vol. 2 series. The character, alongside her partner Colleen Wing, starred in Daughters of the Dragon, a 2005 six-issue limited series by writers Justin Gray and Jimmy Palmiotti and penciller Khari Evans. Knight is one of the stars of the 2006 Heroes for Hire series as well as a supporting character in the ongoing series The Immortal Iron Fist.

In 2010, Knight appears in the crossover event "Shadowland", and is the central character in the spin-off title Shadowland: Blood on the Street. She then goes on to star in the new version of Heroes for Hire. Knight appears in the 2013 series Fearless Defenders, by Cullen Bunn and Will Sliney. She was included in 2017 in Black Panther & The Crew, a comic book starring a group of black characters. It was cancelled after six issues for low sales.

Fictional character biography
Misty Knight was a rising star with the NYPD when she was seriously injured preventing a bomb attack that forced the amputation of her right arm. Rather than take a desk job, she resigned from the police force, though she remained good friends with her long-time partner on the force Rafael Scarfe. Tony Stark provided her a bionic arm that endowed her superhuman strength. Soon after that, she met Spider-Man and then Iron Fist. Misty roomed with X-Men member Marvel Girl until Marvel Girl returned to her life as an X-Man.

Misty teamed with her friend Colleen Wing in fighting the criminal Emil Vachon in the Hong Kong area. She saved Colleen from an attempted beating. She then set up a private detective agency with Colleen entitled: "Knightwing Restorations Ltd".

Soon after she first met Iron Fist, the two crimefighters fell in love. Misty conducted undercover work against the crime lord John Bushmaster. She aided Iron Fist, Spider-Man, and Colleen Wing against Davos, the Steel Serpent. She then first met and fought Luke Cage, Power Man. Misty's "Knightwing Restorations Ltd" detective agency would go on to help Power Man and Iron Fist's Heroes for Hire agency on numerous cases. Misty aided Iron Fist and Power Man in rescuing captives of John Bushmaster and procured a videotape clearing Cage of crimes. Misty was then captured and nearly killed by Nightshade. She then helped the X-Men, Colleen Wing, and Sunfire against Moses Magnum in Japan. She fought Sabretooth, and then fought Constrictor and Sabretooth together, and was rescued by El Aguila. She escaped captivity and captured Ward Meachum. Colleen Wing later broke off her friendship with Misty due to Misty's relationship with Tyrone King. Misty rescued Iron Fist from drowning, reconciled with him, and ended her relationship with Tyrone King. Later, when Iron Fist broke up with her, Misty began a short romance with Power Man. This episode was a source of tension between Power Man and Iron Fist for a brief period.

Misty later learned of Iron Fist's apparent demise. Iron Fist was presumed dead for an extended period until Misty saw the Super-Skrull impersonate Danny Rand (Iron Fist) on television. She confronted the Super-Skrull in his guise as Danny Rand. Misty assisted Namor in finding and saving the hero. They went to the Savage Land, where they learned that the Super-Skrull had been posing as Iron Fist, and Misty aided Namor and Namorita against the Super-Skrull. She and Danny Rand were ultimately reunited and renewed their relationship.

During the 2006 "Civil War" storyline, Misty Knight and Colleen Wing were contacted by Iron Man, Reed Richards, and Spider-Man to re-form Heroes for Hire and track down superhumans who refused to register. Initially hesitant, the pair eventually agree creating a team including Shang-Chi, Humbug, Orka, Black Cat, Paladin, and a new Tarantula. Misty was identified as one of the 142 registered superheroes who was part of the Initiative.

After the Civil War between the superheroes ended, Iron Fist was shocked to find that Misty had sided with the Initiative as he had joined the New Avengers. Nevertheless when the Steel Serpent and HYDRA plotted to kill Iron Fist and destroy the seven cities of heaven (the latter unbeknownst to Steel Serpent), Misty and Colleen rushed with Luke Cage to Danny's aid. Later, the three helped Danny stop a terrorist attack by HYDRA on the mystical city of K'un L'un where Danny told Misty, "I love you, Misty... but I make a lousy boyfriend". Though Danny said this, they continued a sexual relationship and finally committed to each other on his birthday, despite their disagreement over the Superhuman Registration Act.

Returning from a mission to capture Moon-Boy during the World War Hulk storyline, Heroes for Hire arrive in New York to see that it has been taken over by the Hulk. After being captured by Warbound, Colleen Wing and Tarantula were offered to No-Name the Brood Queen by their possessed teammate Humbug. Misty makes a deal with Paladin to take Moon-Boy (whom Colleen had become attached to) to find both Colleen and Tarantula after their capture. When Misty and the other heroes come to save them, Colleen is in traumatic shock from the torture she endured; she is further agitated when Moon-Boy is taken into custody by Paladin. Colleen, deeply upset by her friend's actions, leaves the group as a result. Heroes for Hire itself has disbanded permanently in the aftermath of this. Misty becomes depressed due to her actions that led to the breakup of the group. Iron Man later comes to her to enlist her aid in stopping the Hulk's remaining robots; through this, she was able to move past her mistakes.

Misty and Danny move in with each other in Harlem. Danny proposes to Misty and she accepts, after that she tells him that she is pregnant with his child. They have since found out that this was a false pregnancy, causing a strain on their relationship. They decide to move out of their apartment and live separately, but continue their relationship.

During the 2010 "Shadowland" storyline, Misty, Colleen Wing, Iron Fist, Luke Cage, and Shang-Chi confront Daredevil in an attempt to stop him without violence. After a commotion happens elsewhere in his castle, he attacks the group, believing they are responsible.

Misty teams up with Paladin, Silver Sable and the Shroud to discover who is framing the Hand for the murder of a number of New York's mobsters.

Following the events of the "Shadowland" storyline, Misty revamps the Heroes for Hire concept by basing herself as 'control' and utilizing various street heroes based on their powers and abilities in exchange for money or information. At the end of the first issue, it is revealed that Misty is being manipulated by the Puppet Master. Misty is later freed from mind control with help from Iron Fist and Paladin. After being freed, Paladin approaches Misty to continue the operation Puppet Master set in place, but on her terms.

As part of the Marvel NOW! initiative, Misty Knight showcases in the comic book alongside Valkyrie where she is one of the members of the Fearless Defenders.

Misty Knight appears during the 2015–17 All-New, All-Different Marvel promotion as a supporting character to Sam Wilson, the new Captain America, who is uneasy now that his friend Steve Rogers has regained his original moniker. Though the two men opt to share the name, many civilians in the Marvel Universe feel that Sam Wilson is undeserving of the title. Misty helps him deal with his doubts and is revealed to be in a sexual relationship with him as well. She then helps clear the names of female heroes and villains, who fell victim to a scandal over embarrassing sex videos posted on the internet.

During the "Hunt for Wolverine" storyline, Misty Knight has left the NYPD for an unknown reason. She is approached by Daredevil and Nur who enlist her to help find Wolverine after his body goes missing from its unmarked grave. She takes them to an information broker that she knows who turns out to be Cypher. When Nur hands him a smartphone, Cypher makes use of it and tells Daredevil, Misty Knight, and Nur about the different Wolverine sightings in the past sixty days. Using an Attilan Security Force Skycharger that was "borrowed" from the Inhumans, Daredevil, Misty Knight, Nur, and Cypher investigate the sightings of Wolverine in Manhattan, Phoenix, and Chicago. Misty Knight and Nur arrive at McCarthy Medical Institute in Manhattan where Jane Foster was enrolled and learned that an unnamed man delivered flowers. The security footage revealed that it was by someone that resembled Wolverine. In Chicago, Misty Knight learns from a security guard that he deleted a post when he thought he saw Wolverine. When it came to Saskatchewan, they hear that Ranger Outpost Nine in Meadowlake Provincial Park was attacked by a man with claws. When they arrive, Daredevil, Misty Knight, and Nur find the males dead and the female missing as they head into the forest to investigate. When they find Cypher on the ground with a slit throat, Nur works to heal Cypher as Daredevil and Misty Knight discover that the attacker is Albert as they fight him. When Albert grabs Daredevil by the neck and demands to know what he did to Elsie-Dee, Misty Knight combines her bionic arm's attacks with Nur's gun and a recovered Cypher's laser to deactivate Albert as they leave an anonymous tip for the Canadian authorities to come to pick him up. Upon returning to Chicago, Daredevil, Misty Knight, and Nur visit the security guard she questioned again only to find him dead and a bomb nearby as it goes off. Misty Knight's cybernetic arm manifested a shield big enough to protect her, Daredevil, and Nur from the explosion. Then they worked to evacuate those who couldn't get out of the burning building. Nur reveals to Misty Knight that his eyes also work as a camera flash as he analyzed the apartment before it blew up. His analysis revealed that the security guard worked for a group called Soteira which was listed as an asset management company. Daredevil, Misty Knight, and Nur head to one of their offices in Chicago where Daredevil's radar detects the people inside purging their records. As the group crashes through the window, Nur holds the workers at gunpoint as Cypher works to see if he can stop whatever they were doing on the computer. Misty Knight works to protect Cypher who retrieves the data as the four of them escape from the Level Four Killteam. When Misty Knight asks what to do next, Daredevil states that he is grateful for their help as this is no longer a missing persons case. As Nur asks what he plans to do with the drive after getting him, Misty Knight, and Cypher back to New York, Daredevil says that he is giving it to Kitty Pryde while informing her on who else is looking for Wolverine and what they are walking into. Nur recaps his wife leaving him following his Terrigenesis and tells Misty Knight that he looks forward to working with her again.

Iron Man later enlists Misty Knight to help him rescue James Rhodes from Korvac.

Powers and abilities
Misty Knight is a highly skilled combatant who, in addition to her police-combat training, is proficient in martial arts and possesses near-perfect aim with firearms. She is a superb detective, having graduated at the top of her class at the police academy and earned a degree in criminology from the John Jay College of Criminal Justice. Her bionic arm is superhumanly strong, and she can punch a target with incredible force, or crush objects as tough as steel in her vise-like grip. Since the rest of her body is not cybernetically enhanced, she cannot lift objects heavier than her back, shoulders, and legs can physically support. Her arm's advantages as a weapon are limited to kinetic crushing and impact forces.

Her original bionic right arm was constructed from steel, and designed by Stark International. Her new arm was built by Stark Industries and is an alloy of Antarctic vibranium and diamond; at close range it can liquefy all known metals, including adamantium. It is now able to generate a wide anti-gravity repulsor field similar to Iron Man's armor.  It can apparently release a concentrated beam of cryogenic energy, which can cover a target in a blanket of ice from a distance. This cold seems to make the target much more fragile, allowing otherwise durable materials to be broken or rended when frozen. Iron Man revealed the arm also displays technopathic capabilities, teaching Misty how to control a horde of robots. Following her "pregnancy", Danny Rand spent money on additional features to the arm, including magnetism and a concussive blast.

A couple of new upgrades given to her bionics were shown during her hunt across the world for the recently resurrected Wolverine. Showcasing an energy shield to ward off incoming assaults with, a force field which she can expand over a marginal radius to help protect multiple people if need be. It even has a deployed grapple line within the forearm for use as an extension to reach and grab objects a good distance away. Often useful for latching onto and swinging from place to place with or to escape deadly falls from great heights.

Other versions

Age of Apocalypse
In the Age of Apocalypse reality, Misty was one of many 'flatscans'- non-mutants- forced underground by Apocalypse. When her friends were attacked by a Brood, that had come to Earth, Misty escaped with the aid of Scott and Alex Summers, only to subsequently die fighting the reanimated corpses of her former friends.

MC2
In the alternate future of the MC2 universe, Misty eventually settled down and married Iron Fist. Unfortunately, at some point in the past, she died of cancer. Because of this Iron Fist gave up crime-fighting, and began to live as a simple martial arts trainer.

Ultimate Marvel
The Ultimate Marvel Universe version of Misty Knight has appeared in the 2006 limited series Ultimate Extinction which was written by Warren Ellis and drawn by Brandon Peterson. She appears to have the same origin story as before, with an artificial arm created by Tony Stark. While investigating a "Paul Maitreya", a cult leader who resembles the Silver Surfer, she encounters a bald-headed woman who shoots Paul and his cult before escaping Misty. This woman appears to be one of an army of genetic clones of Heather Douglas a.k.a. Moondragon.

In Ultimate Mystery, Misty Knight later became a scientist and appears as a member of Roxxon Brain Trust.

House Of M
In the alternate timeline of the 2005 "House of M" storyline, Misty Knight is part of Luke Cage's resistance and is killed when a Sentinel attacks their base and Cloak fails to teleport her out. It was revealed within the past that Misty was originally placed in Luke Cage's Avengers as an NYPD spy operating under Thunderbird (John Proudstar), but defected to the Avengers after refusing Proudstar's order to kill Cage. Misty eventually became Luke's lover, after some time has passed since the Taskmaster's murder of Tigra. It was Misty who realized that Luke's Avengers were inspiring non-mutants to fight for their rights as "Sapien" and tried to convince Cage to think beyond protecting Sapien Town.

newuniversal
In newuniversal: Shockfront #1, Knight appears as a detective assigned to apprehend John Tensen. She is partnered with Jean DeWolff.

Earth-13584
In A.I.M.'s pocket dimension of Earth-13584, Misty Knight appears as a member of Spider-Man's gang.

In other media

Television

 Misty Knight appears in The Super Hero Squad Show episode "A Brat Walks Among Us!", voiced by Tamera Mowry. This version is a member of the Heroes for Hire.
 Misty Knight appears in Marvel's Netflix television series, portrayed by Simone Missick. This version is a detective at the NYPD's 29th Precinct in Harlem known by her colleagues for her tendency to visualize crime scenes through viewing photos.
 First appearing in the first season of Luke Cage, she is partnered with Detective Rafael Scarfe, though she is unaware he is secretly working for Cornell "Cottonmouth" Stokes. As the season progresses, she attempts to expose Cottonmouth's crimes, along with those of Willis "Diamondback" Stryker, Shades, and councilwoman Mariah Dillard as well as investigating Luke Cage's connection to them. After Scarfe is killed trying to extort Cottonmouth, Knight is reassigned to work under Inspector Priscilla Ridley. At the end of the season, Misty goes undercover at the Harlem's Paradise nightclub to spy on Mariah and Shades.
 Misty appears in The Defenders. As of this series, she has been promoted to a citywide task force investigating crimes committed by the Hand and joins forces with Cage, Jessica Jones, Matt Murdock, Danny Rand, Colleen Wing, and Claire Temple to protect their loved ones and defeat the Hand. While Knight loses an arm to Bakuto in the process, she learns Rand arranged for her to receive a bionic prosthetic while recovering in the hospital.
 As of the second season of Luke Cage, set after the events of The Defenders, Knight is still in therapy, adjusting to life without her arm amidst mockery from her coworkers and criminals alike, especially her rival Detective Nandi Tyler. After receiving advice from Wing, Knight agrees to be outfitted with the Rand Enterprises prosthetic arm before resuming her investigation into Dillard and Shades' criminal activities as well as Bushmaster's attacks on the pair.
 Knight also appears in the second season of Iron Fist.

Video games
 Misty Knight appears in Iron Fist's ending for Ultimate Marvel vs. Capcom 3 as a member of his new Heroes for Hire.
 Misty Knight appears as an assist character Marvel Heroes, voiced by Cynthia McWilliams. This version is a member of the Heroes for Hire.
 Misty Knight appears as an unlockable playable character in Marvel Avengers Alliance.
 Misty Knight appears in Marvel War of Heroes.
 Misty Knight appears as an unlockable playable character in Marvel Avengers Academy, voiced by Cenophia Mitchell.
 Misty Knight appears as an unlockable playable character in Marvel Future Fight.
 Misty Knight appears as an unlockable playable character in Lego Marvel Super Heroes 2.
 Misty Knight appears in Marvel Contest of Champions.
 Misty Knight appears in Marvel Snap.

Cultural references 

A character named Misty Knight appears in Quentin Tarantino's My Best Friend's Birthday. She is named after the Marvel character.

Notes

References

External links
 
 
 World of Black Heroes: Misty Biography
 

African-American superheroes
Characters created by Tony Isabella
Comics characters introduced in 1975
Fictional amputees
Fictional New York City Police Department officers
Fictional private investigators
Fictional women soldiers and warriors
Iron Fist (comics)
Luke Cage
Marvel Comics characters with superhuman strength
Marvel Comics cyborgs
Marvel Comics female superheroes
Marvel Comics martial artists
Marvel Comics police officers
Marvel Comics sidekicks
Marvel Comics superheroes